Schizomeria ovata, a medium to large Australian rainforest tree, is widespread in warm-temperate rainforest in coastal New South Wales north from Narooma (36° S) and southern Queensland south from Fraser Island (25° S). It is also found in Papua New Guinea and the Solomon Islands.

Common names:  (Australian) white birch, crab apple, white cherry, snowberry, humbug, squeaker

Timber is pale blond, and is a commercial species, under the name Australian white birch. The timber was notably used as an interior finish in the Sydney Opera House. Plywood veneered with Schizomeria ovata  was used for the ceiling, upper walls, and seating of the Concert Hall, and for wall and ceiling panelling and doors in other internal areas. The Schizomeria ovata veneer had been specially dyed to meet the Opera House specifications at the Veneer and Plywood Pty Ltd. plant at Yarras in the Hastings valley and was given the commercial name of 'Cinnamon birch', a warm 'cinnamon' color.

For a refurbishment in 2018 selected Australian White Birch veneer was manufactured into moulded ply theatre seating by Emtek Furniture Brisbane. A white wash finish matching the original approved by the Opera House Trust was applied.

References

PlantNET
Australian Plant Name Index (APNI)
Brisbane Rainforest Action & Information Network

Flora of Queensland
Flora of New South Wales
Oxalidales of Australia
Trees of Australia
Cunoniaceae